"Girl I Am Searching for You" is the third single from freestyle singer Stevie B's second album In My Eyes.

Track listing
US CD Maxi single

Charts

References

1989 singles
Stevie B songs
1988 songs